Lake Dorene is a reservoir in Polk County, in the U.S. state of Georgia.

"Dorene" is a conjoin of the first names of two local women, Dorothy Rhinehart and Irene Everett.

See also
List of lakes in Georgia (U.S. state)

References

Geography of Polk County, Georgia
Dorene